Body Troopers, also known as Chasing the Kidneystone, is a 1996 Norwegian children's film directed by Vibeke Idsøe, starring Torbjörn T. Jensen and Kjersti Holmen. Eight-year-old Simon shrinks himself to microscopic size in order to travel through his ailing grandfather's body in search of a kidney stone. On his journey he meets anthropomorphic characters such as the taste buds, white and red blood cells, and the vocal cords.

The film is based on the book Jakten på nyresteinen, also written by Idsøe.

Awards

See also
 Fantastic Voyage
 Resizing (fiction)

References

External links
 
 Jakten på nyresteinen at Filmweb.no (Norwegian)
 Jakten på nyresteinen at the Norwegian Film Institute

1996 films
1990s science fiction films
Norwegian children's films
1990s children's fantasy films